Johann Schmidlap  of Schorndorf was a 16th-century Bavarian fireworks maker and rocket pioneer.

He published  a book on fireworks, Künstliche und rechtschaffene Feuerwerck zum Schimpff ("artful and well-made fireworks for entertainment"), printed in Nuremberg in 1561 (reprinted 1564, new edition by Katharina Gerlachin in 1590, 1591).

He may have been the first to successfully fly staged rockets, although the concept is also discussed in the work of Conrad Haas, which was a direct influence on Schmidlap.

Look also 
Kazimierz Siemienowicz

References

Rocket scientists
Early spaceflight scientists
Early rocketry
People from the Duchy of Bavaria